Linares Airport ,  is an airport serving Linares, a city in the Maule Region of Chile.

See also

Transport in Chile
List of airports in Chile

References

External links
OpenStreetMap - Linares
OurAirports - Linares
FallingRain - Linares Airport

Airports in Chile
Airports in Maule Region